"The Way You Look To-night" is a song from the film Swing Time that was performed by Fred Astaire and composed by Jerome Kern with lyrics written by Dorothy Fields. It won the Academy Award for Best Original Song in 1936. Fields remarked, "The first time Jerry played that melody for me I went out and started to cry. The release absolutely killed me. I couldn't stop, it was so beautiful."

In the movie, Astaire sang "The Way You Look To-night" to Ginger Rogers while she was washing her hair in an adjacent room. Astaire's recording was a top seller in 1936. Other versions that year were by Guy Lombardo and Teddy Wilson with Billie Holiday.

Composition and publication
The song was sung by Fred Astaire in the 1936 film Swing Time in the key of D major, but it is typically performed in E-flat major with a modulation to G-flat major.

It was first copyrighted on March 17, 1936 as "Way (The) you look to-night; song from I won't dance", and was unpublished ("I Won't Dance" was a song from the 1935 film Roberta by Kern and Fields). The next copyright on July 24, 1936 was from Swing Time and was published. Both were renewed in 1963.

Contemporary recordings 
Fred Astaire recorded "The Way You Look To-night" in Los Angeles on July 26, 1936. Bing Crosby and his wife Dixie Lee recorded the song as a duet on August 19.

To take advantage of the song's success, pianist Teddy Wilson brought Billie Holiday into a studio 10 weeks after the film Swing Time was released. Holiday was 21 when she recorded "The Way You Look Tonight" with a small group led by Wilson in October 1936.

A number of British dance bands also made contemporary cover recordings of the song: Ambrose (with vocals by Sam Browne), Roy Fox (with vocals by Denny Dennis), Tommy Kinsman, Harry Roy, Carroll Gibbons and the Savoy Hotel Orpheans (vocal by George Melachrino) and Jay Wilbur (with vocals by Sam Costa).

Cover versions
Six years passed before the song appeared on the charts again, this time in a version by Benny Goodman with Peggy Lee on vocals and Mel Powell on celeste. 
A live recording was released by Dave Brubeck Quartet in their 1953 live album Jazz at Oberlin.
The most popular and imitated version was recorded by Frank Sinatra with the Nelson Riddle orchestra in 1964. 
The Lettermen found their first hit when their version reached No. 13 on the Billboard magazine Hot 100 singles chart in 1961 and No. 36 on the UK Singles Chart that same year. 
Sonny Rollins and Thelonious Monk recorded it in 1954. 
Tony Bennett recorded the song on his album Long Ago and Far Away in 1958, and then again with the Ralph Sharon Trio for the film My Best Friend’s Wedding, released in 1997. The singer also recorded two duets of the song: with Faith Hill in 2011 on Duets II and one year later on his album Viva Duets with Thalía. A new version only accompanied by the piano of Bill Charlap was on the album The Silver Lining: The Songs of Jerome Kern in 2015.
Olivia Newton-John covered the song on her 1989 album Warm and Tender.
Phil Collins did a live version cover of the song, which is included in the 2004 album Love Songs: A Compilation... Old and New.
Brad Mehldau included a version on his 1998 album Live at the Village Vanguard: The Art of the Trio Volume Two
Rod Stewart included it on the album Great American Songbook in 2002. 
Cuban-American singer Gloria Estefan included a cover of this song in her 2013 album The Standards. 
Jane Ira Bloom included the song in her 2013 album Sixteen Sunsets. 
Cassandra Wilson included the song in her 2015 album Coming Forth by Day.
Ella Fitzgerald on her Verve Records 1963 release Ella Fitzgerald Sings the Jerome Kern Song Book.
 Dermot Mulroney sings the song to Julia Roberts in the movie My Best Friend's Wedding.
 The Jaguars, a Los Angeles quartet, recorded it in 1956.  Their version was only a regional hit when it was first released. Three years later, its appearance on Volume 1 of Art Laboe's “Oldies But Goodies” album series brought it national attention, and it remains a doo-wop favorite to this day.
 Chris Pratt, in character as Andy Dwyer with his band Mouse Rat, performed a version of the song in the Parks and Recreation episode "Galentine's Day". The cover was later included in Mouse Rat's 2021 album, The Awesome Album.

Other versions
Other versions were also recorded by Clifford Brown, Tina Brooks, Johnny Griffin (with John Coltrane), Charlie Parker, Michael Buble, Johnny Maestro and The Crests.

Charts

The Lettermen

See also
 List of 1930s jazz standards

References

External links
 The Way You Look Tonight lyrics
 Jazz standards - The Way You Look Tonight
 Cafe Songbook - The Way You Look Tonight

Songs about nights
1930s jazz standards
1936 songs
1961 debut singles
Songs with lyrics by Dorothy Fields
Songs with music by Jerome Kern
Fred Astaire songs
The Lettermen songs
Bing Crosby songs
Peggy Lee songs
Frank Sinatra songs
Guy Lombardo songs
Best Original Song Academy Award-winning songs
Pop standards
Capitol Records singles